County routes in Saratoga County, New York, are signed with the Manual on Uniform Traffic Control Devices-standard yellow-on-blue pentagon route marker. The highest numbered route in the county, County Route 1345 (CR 1345), is the only signed four-digit route of any type in the state.

Routes 1–50

Routes 51 and up

See also

County routes in New York

References

External links

Empire State Roads – Saratoga County Roads